Konul Asadova (born 29 March 1988) is an Azerbaijani former footballer who played as a midfielder. She has been a member of the Azerbaijan women's national team.

See also
List of Azerbaijan women's international footballers

References

1988 births
Living people
Women's association football midfielders
Azerbaijani women's footballers
Azerbaijan women's international footballers